The 2019 Latvian First League (referred to as the Pirmā līga) was played with 10 teams meeting each other three times.

League table

Table

Playoffs 

SK Super Nova were not promoted.

External links 
 RSSSF

Latvian First League seasons
2
Latvia
Latvia